King Frederick may refer to:

 Frederick I of Denmark
 Frederick II of Denmark
 Frederick III of Denmark
 Frederick IV of Denmark
 Frederick V of Denmark
 Frederick VI of Denmark
 Frederick VII of Denmark
 Frederick VIII of Denmark
 Frederick IX of Denmark
 Frederick I of Sweden
 Frederick I of Prussia, previously Frederick III, Elector of Brandenburg
 Frederick II of Prussia, Frederick the Great
 Frederick III, German Emperor, also King Frederick III of Prussia
 Frederick I of Württemberg (1754–1816)
 Frederick of Naples
 Frederick I, Holy Roman Emperor, also King of Italy
 Frederick II, Holy Roman Emperor, also King Frederick I of Sicily
 Frederick III, Holy Roman Emperor, also King of Italy
 Frederick III of Sicily
 Frederick the Simple
 Frederick the Fair
 Frederick V of the Palatinate

In addition, a number of kings of Prussia were named Frederick William:
Frederick William I of Prussia (1688–1740)
Frederick William II of Prussia (1744–1797)
Frederick William III of Prussia (1770–1840)
Frederick William IV of Prussia (1795–1861)